Jan Matouš (born 30 May 1961) is a former Czechoslovakian biathlete. At the 1987 World Championships in Lake Placid, New York. Matouš won a bronze medal in the 20 km individual. He also won a silver medal in the team competition at the 1990 World Championships in Minsk.
Matouš's best Olympic placing was a 9th place in the sprint event at the 1984 Olympics in Sarajevo.

Biathlon results
All results are sourced from the International Biathlon Union.

Olympic Games

World Championships
2 medals (1 silver, 1 bronze)

*During Olympic seasons competitions are only held for those events not included in the Olympic program.
**Team was added as an event in 1989.

Individual victories
2 victories (2 In)

*Results are from UIPMB and IBU races which include the Biathlon World Cup, Biathlon World Championships and the Winter Olympic Games.

References

External links
 
 

1961 births
Living people
People from Vrchlabí
Czechoslovak male biathletes
Biathletes at the 1984 Winter Olympics
Biathletes at the 1988 Winter Olympics
Olympic biathletes of Czechoslovakia
Biathlon World Championships medalists